Minica (Mɨnɨka) Huitoto is one of three indigenous American Huitoto languages of the Witotoan family spoken by a few thousand speakers in western South America.

It is spoken in the Upper Igara-Paraná river area, along the Caquetá River at the Isla de los Monos, and the Caguán River near San Vicente del Caguán. There is 75% literacy in Colombia and 85% are literate in Spanish; most are bilingual. There is a dictionary and grammar rules.

There are only five speakers in Perú, where it has official standing within its community.

Phonology

Vowels

Consonants 

 Stops /b, d, ɡ/ may also be prenasalized as [ᵐb, ⁿd, ᵑɡ] in word-initial position.
 Labial consonants /b, ɸ, m/ may also be heard as labialized [bʷ, ɸʷ, mʷ] before the back-close vowel /ɯ/.

Writing system

Notes

Languages of Colombia
Languages of Peru
Witotoan languages